The Såheim Power Station  is a hydroelectric power station located in Rjukan, Vestfold og Telemark, Norway, operated by Norsk Hydro. The station building from 1915 was designed by architects Thorvald Astrup and Olaf Nordhagen.

See also

References 

Hydroelectric power stations in Norway
Buildings and structures in Vestfold og Telemark
Tinn